Isola delle Bisce Lighthouse is an active lighthouse located on a 
small islet,  from Capo Ferro Lighthouse, which make part of the Maddalena archipelago in the Strait of Bonifacio. The lighthouse guides the ships through the narrow Canale delle Bisce; the structure is situated in the municipality of Arzachena on the Tyrrhenian Sea.

Description
The tower and the lantern are painted white, the balcony in green and the lantern dome in grey metallic. The lighthouse is completely automated, powered by a solar unit and managed by the Marina Militare with the identification code number 1148 E.F.

See also
 List of lighthouses in Italy
 Strait of Bonifacio

References

External links

 Servizio Fari Marina Militare

Isola Bisce
Isola Bisce